Adam Mamawala (born May 18, 1987, Aurora, Illinois) is an American stand-up comic.  He graduated from Hillsborough High School in Hillsborough Township, New Jersey in 2005 and graduated from The College of New Jersey in Ewing Township, New Jersey with a degree in Communication Studies in 2009.  He is of half-Indian and half-German ancestry.

He makes use of accents, and laughs at his own name, as means of diffusing and parodying stereotypes of South Asians.

Biography 
Mamawala was featured in The Chronicle of Higher Education, the news journal of North American college administrators. His signature comedy routine is "about a GPS system that (speaks) in different accents ...."

Mamawala was a finalist in Catch a Rising Star's Comedy Challenge in November 2006, which allowed him an opportunity to perform in Atlantic City in December 2006.  From there, he won the 2007 New Jersey Comedy Festival, where he was crowned "New Jersey King of Campus Comedy."  Adam performed frequently on campus during his time at The College of New Jersey, and in 2009 he hosted the New Jersey Comedy Festival.  He also performed with Kel Mitchell at a charity show in June 2008, and in November 2009 he opened for Nigel Lawrence at Boston University's BU Central.

He has performed throughout different comedy clubs, including Caroline's, Comix, New York, Broadway, Gotham Comedy Clubs, and The Stress Factory.

References

External links 
 Personal blog
 Video of November 2006 stand-up
 Photographs from Catch a Rising Star on another young comic's web site

21st-century American comedians
American stand-up comedians
American comedians of Indian descent
People from Hillsborough Township, New Jersey
People from Aurora, Illinois
American people of German descent
Hillsborough High School (New Jersey) alumni
The College of New Jersey alumni
Comedians from Illinois
1987 births
Living people